Aconitum flavum ( 伏毛鐵棒鎚 , Chinese interpretation : Fluff iron hammer ) is a species of flowering plant in the genus Aconitum of the family Ranunculaceae, native and endemic to northwestern Sichuan, northern Tibet, Qinghai, Gansu, southern Ningxia and southern Inner Mongolia.

It grows at a grassy slope or sparse forest at an altitude of 2000–3700 meters.

Ethnobotanical medicinal value 
Roots are used for rheumatoid arthritis, joint pain or partial muscle soreness and numbness, chronic pain after bone fracture, recurrent tinea, favus, persistent pain of bruises.

Roots can eliminate drunkenness, opium poisoning, traumatic bleeding, rheumatism, bone pain, etc.

Used for ethnic group and medicine name 
Bai people, medicine name【白藥 : 嘿德】
Lis people, medicine, name【僳僳藥 : 垛箭】
Nakhi people, medicine name【纳西藥 : 堵那】
Yi people, medicine name【彝藥 : 都拉】

Phytochemical 

Aconitine
napelline
3-Acetylaconitine
flavaconitine
3-deoxyaconitine
dehydronapelline
1-epinapelline
12-epinapelline
12-acetyllucidusculine
1-demethylhypaconitine
lucidusculine
benzoylaconine
neoline
flavadine
flavamine
flavaconidine
N-acetylflavaconitine
flavaconijine

References 

flavum